Matejić is a Serbian surname, a patronymic derived from Mateja. It may refer to:

Božur Matejić (born 1963), former Serbian footballer
Mateja Matejić (born 1924), Serbian Orthodox priest
Paulj Matejić (c. 1770–1816), Serbian Revolutionary

See also
 
Matejević
Matijić
Matijević

Serbian surnames
Patronymic surnames
Surnames from given names